Elizabeth Garber (1939–2020) was an American historian of science known for her work on James Clerk Maxwell and the history of physics. She was a professor of history for many years at Stony Brook University.

Education and career
Elizabeth Anne Wolfe was born in England and studied mathematics, physics, and geology at the University of London. After moving to the United States and marrying physicist Donald Garber, she earned a Ph.D. from Case Western Reserve University with a dissertation on Maxwell. She became a faculty member at Stony Brook University, and retired in 2008.

Books
Garber was the author of:
The Language of Physics: The Calculus and the Development of Theoretical Physics in Europe, 1750-1914 (Birkhäuser, 1999)

She co-edited several books collecting the works of James Clerk Maxwell:
Maxwell on Saturn's Rings (edited with Stephen G. Brush and C. W. F. Everitt, MIT Press, 1983)
Maxwell on Molecules and Gases (edited with Stephen G. Brush and C. W. F. Everitt, MIT Press, 1986)
Maxwell on Heat and Statistical Mechanics: On "Avoiding All Personal Enquiries of Molecules" (edited with Stephen G. Brush and C. W. F. Everitt, Associated University Presses, 1995)

She also edited:
Beyond History of Science: Essays in Honor of Robert E. Schofield (Lehigh University Press, 1990)

Recognition
Garber was named a Fellow of the American Physical Society in 1989 "for her research in the history of physics, including the development of kinetic theory and molecular science in the 19th century."

References

Living people
American historians of science
American women historians
Alumni of the University of London
Stony Brook University faculty
Fellows of the American Physical Society
1939 births
21st-century American women